Alina Bulmag (born 6 September 1995) is a Moldovan swimmer. She competed in the women's 100 metre breaststroke event at the 2017 World Aquatics Championships.

References

1995 births
Living people
Moldovan female breaststroke swimmers
Place of birth missing (living people)
20th-century Moldovan women
21st-century Moldovan women